Totino-Grace High School is a private Catholic high school in Fridley, Minnesota. It is an archdiocesan co-educational Catholic high school in the Lasallian tradition.

History

Founding 
In the late 1950s, the Archdiocese of Saint Paul and Minneapolis in Minnesota sought to expand the number of Catholic high schools in the Twin Cities area. At the same time, Monsignor Joseph Lapinski, pastor of Immaculate Conception Parish in Columbia Heights, purchased some land in nearby Fridley in the hope that the archdiocese would build one of these new high schools there. Approval for a new high school in Fridley was soon given, and in 1965, the Christian Brothers accepted responsibility for administration of the school. The School Sisters of Notre Dame joined the Brothers in this task, and opened Archbishop Grace High School in September 1966, with 175 freshmen. The first graduating class was the Class of 1970.

Early years 
From its very beginning, the Brothers and Sisters worked alongside laymen and laywomen as their counterparts in the school's operation. To this day, the staff have provided the tradition that is one of the school's values. The school grew throughout the late 1960s and early 1970s. In 1970, the Christian Brothers informed the Archdiocese that they could no longer be personally responsible for the financial operation of the school, and a lay Corporate Board was begun to formulate policy for the school.

The school was originally named to honor Archbishop Thomas L. Grace, an early Minnesota bishop who was a pioneer in education. In 1980, the name of the school was augmented to Totino-Grace to honor the generous benefaction of Jim and Rose Totino, entrepreneurs in the frozen pizza business. Today Totino-Grace is one of the largest (with a student population of approximately 800) of the thirteen Catholic high schools in the Archdiocese of St. Paul and Minneapolis.

21st century 
The school's long association with the Christian Brothers and its support of the Lasallian educational mission led Totino-Grace to declare itself to be a Lasallian School in 1997. Totino-Grace is now part of a worldwide network of Lasallian Schools with approximately 5000 Brothers and 70,000 lay colleagues teaching nearly one million students in eighty-two countries.

Staff controversies 
On July 2, 2013, the school president, Dr. William Hudson, resigned and disclosed that he had been in an 18-year-long same-sex relationship. The school hired Craig Junker as his replacement.

Totino-Grace also terminated the employment of English and religion teacher Kristen Ostendorf in August 2013 two days after her coming-out as a lesbian. Ostendorf taught at Totino-Grace High School without issue for 18 years but was summarily dismissed when she refused to resign willingly from her position. When asked why she came out as a lesbian despite the obvious threat to her job, Ostendorf stated that she found herself unwilling to remain "part of a community where I was required to hide and compromise and deny who I am".

Athletics
Totino-Grace offer 18 different sport activities, including baseball, basketball, bowling, cheerleading, cross country, dance, football, golf, ice hockey, lacrosse, soccer, softball, swimming, tennis, track and field, volleyball, weight lifting and wrestling. There are also a number of extracurricular organizations.

Bowling
In recent years, bowling has become the most popular athletic activity at Totino-Grace. A varsity team and 6 JV teams compete in the Minnesota High School Bowling Metro Central Conference. In 2015, the varsity team made their first state tournament appearance and finished 2nd overall, losing in the championship match.

Football
The football team was Minnesota State Champions in 1977, 1978, 2003, 2004, 2006, 2007, 2009, and 2010 in the Class AAAA division. In 1977, 1978, 2006 2009 and 2012, the Eagles had perfect records. The team also had a second-place finish in 1989, along with 24 total state tournament appearances. In 2011, the team moved up to Class AAAAA, and in 2012, the team won the Class AAAAA state championship.  In 2013, the team moved up to Class AAAAAA. In 2016, the team won their first Class AAAAAA championship, defeating Eden Prairie, 28–20, in the Prep Bowl.

Hockey
The men's hockey team won the Class A state tournament in 2002 vs Red Wing 3-2 and finished the season 27-2-1. The men's team also finished 2nd in the state during the 1995 and 2005 seasons. In the 1995 Championship game, International Falls scored with only 17.3 seconds left in the game, to beat Grace, 3–2. In 2005, Totino-Grace fell to Warroad in the second overtime, 4–3.

Basketball
Girls' basketball won the state tournament in 2008 and 2022!

Soccer
Girls' soccer won the state tournament in 2001, 2002 and 2007. Boys' soccer won the state tournament in 2002, 2004. and 2017.

In 2009, Paul Yonga was named Class A Mr. Soccer. Yonga owns the career scoring record at T-G, the single season and career assists record, and was named the best player in the North Suburban Conference as both a junior and a senior. He was First-Team All-State three years in a row, and was chosen as the Minnesota High School Gatorade Boys Soccer Player of the Year as a junior.

Dance team
The E'gals Dance Team has won many state championships and has placed in at least the top 4 every year.

Track and field
Track and field has had many true team state appearances, including a boys' first-place finish in 2006 and girls in 2008. The track and field team won the True Team State Championship in both the boys and girls division in 2009. This is the first time in school history that both boys and girls have won in the same season.

Cross country
The boys' cross country team had their first state appearance in 2009. 
The girl's cross country team won the MN State Championship in their first appearance in 1970. This was the first state championship for the then-recently established T.L. Grace High School, now Totino Grace. Four members of the team competed in 1970 Nationals in St. Louis.

Lacrosse
In addition to many conference and state championships by numerous teams, the 2010 Totino-Grace Boys Varsity Lacrosse team won its first section 4 title.

Girls' tennis
Totino-Grace High School's girls' tennis is a fall season sport as well as a no-cut program, allowing players of any ability level (beginner or experienced) to join. This sport is split into a team of eleven to twelve varsity players with the remaining joining junior varsity. The varsity team is led by the head coach, Dave Wareham, and the assistant coach, Paul Cleary. Meanwhile, the junior varsity team is led by the head coach, Steve Gunz, and the assistant coach, Tom Kocon.

Performing arts
Totino-Grace is widely known throughout the country for the choir and band programs. Under the direction of Terrence Voss (choir) and Tim Hoffman (band), the performing arts at Totino-Grace have grown immensely in popularity and esteem or the past few years. They have performed in many ceremonies, such as their performances with the Minnesota National Guard Band in 2012 or most recently at The 50th Anniversary of the Assassination of John F. Kennedy Ceremony in Washington D.C. in January 2013.

Show choir
Much like the Totino-Grace academic choir, the school's varsity show choir, Company of Singers, has had great success since its beginning. Under the direction of Terry Voss and Tim Hoffman, along with assistant directors Heather Douglas and Bryce Mahlstedt, the group is an all student ensemble, with accompanying crew and band. Over the past decade they have grown into one of the most recognizable show choirs in the country. After their perfect season in 2010 where the group swept at all of their competitions, the groups has gone on to compete both the FAME Nationals and the National Competition in Nashville, Tennessee.

Notable alumni
 Kimberly Potter police officer
 John Crockett, NFL running back
 Ben Meyer, MLB pitcher for the Miami Marlins
 Hockey Alumni that have played professionally, Andy Disch 1996  Daniel Delisle 2009   Derek Lodermeier 2013

References

External links
 

Roman Catholic Archdiocese of Saint Paul and Minneapolis
Catholic secondary schools in Minnesota
Schools in Anoka County, Minnesota
Educational institutions established in 1966
Minnesota
1966 establishments in Minnesota
Private high schools in Minnesota